Saterland Frisian may refer to:

 Something of, from, or related to Saterland
 Saterland Frisian language
 Saterland Frisians

See also 
 Frisian (disambiguation)

Language and nationality disambiguation pages